Hymenocallis ornata is a bulb-forming herb native to Guatemala. It has showy white flowers and is frequently grown as an ornamental in many places.

Hymenocallis ornata is a bulb-forming perennial with flowers in an umbel.

References

ornata
Flora of Guatemala
Plants described in 1839